Annie Hoey (born 3 October 1988) is an Irish Labour Party politician who has served as a Senator for the Agricultural Panel since April 2020.

Early life and education
Hoey is from Beamore, Drogheda, a suburb just by the border between County Meath and County Louth. She is the daughter of Raymond and Elizabeth and has two sisters.

She graduated with a Bachelor of Arts in Drama and Theatre Studies in 2009, a Master of Arts in Comparative and World Literature in 2012, and a Postgraduate certificate in Women's Studies in 2013, all from University College Cork. Hoey was voted "college society person of the year" in 2013 for her work with Amnesty, as chairperson of the LGBT Society, and for co-founding of a humanist society in Cork. She also co-founded UCC's first ever feminist society, FemSoc.

Hoey later went on to study a specialist diploma in Quality Management at the University of Limerick in 2019.

Career

Representative student organisations
In 2013, Hoey was elected as the deputy president and campaigns officer for UCC Students' Union.

At the Union of Students in Ireland congress in April 2014, Hoey was elected as the Vice President for Equality and Citizenship. In March 2015, Hoey was re-elected to the same position.

During 2014 and 2015, in the lead up to the referendum of the Thirty-fourth Amendment of the Constitution of Ireland, known as the Marriage Equality referendum, Hoey used her role as USI Equality and Citizenship Officer to mobilise students across the country. She organised USI's flagship Pink Training event in Cork in November 2014. The weekend conference focused heavily on training students in campaigning for a Yes vote and it was attended by a record number of students. In the months leading up to the vote in 2015, Hoey traveled across the country conducting training events for students on messaging and canvassing. Hoey's mobilisation work accumulated with an idea of a ‘voter motor,’ a campaign that was launched by USI in the final week of the campaign to encourage people to give their fellow citizens a lift to the polling stations.

During Hoey's second term as the UCI Vice President for Equality and Citizenship, she was appointed Deputy President of USI to USI President Kevin Donoghue.

Hoey then served as President of the Union of Students in Ireland from 2016 to 2017. During her tenure as USI President, an estimated 15,000 students took part in the #EducationIs demonstration in Dublin, to show student opposition to income contingent loan schemes. In March 2017, Hoey presented to the Citizens' Assembly at the fourth meeting of the Citizens' Assembly on the Eighth Amendment of the Constitution.

Hoey was also a board member of the Higher Education Authority.

Political work
Hoey took up the role as the Education and Training officer for the Coalition to Repeal the Eighth Amendment in 2017. Soon after, Hoey was appointed as the National Canvassing Coordinator and a spokesperson for Together For Yes working for long-time campaigner Ailbhe Smyth.

During the 2018 presidential election, Hoey was appointed Volunteer Director for Campaign to Re-elect Michael D. Higgins. Shortly after, Hoey was employed as the Women and Youth Development Manager with the Labour Party from 2019 to 2020.

Meath County Council
In the 2019 local elections Hoey was elected on the 9th count in May 2019 to represent Laytown-Bettystown local electoral area on the Meath County Council with 1,093 first preference votes. She served as a member of Meath County Council from 2019 to 2020.

2020 elections
In February 2020, Hoey unsuccessfully contested the 2020 general election as the Labour Party candidate for the Meath East constituency, receiving 874 first preference votes (2.08%).

In March 2020, Hoey successfully contested the 2020 Seanad election as the Labour Party candidate for the Agricultural Panel. Hoey received 63 first preference votes (weighted to a value of 63,000) and was elected on the 20th count with a final weighted vote tally of 94,186.  Elaine McGinty was co-opted to Hoey's seat on Meath County Council following her election to the Seanad.

Seanad Éireann
Hoey was one of five Labour Senators to seek a High Court ruling to determine whether the Seanad can sit before the eleven Taoiseach's nominees have been chosen. In July 2020, Hoey was appointed Party Spokesperson on Higher Education, Innovation and Research. She would go on to introduce legislation to link student nurses and midwives pay to Health Care Assistants' pay in December 2020 after months of campaigning.

Personal life
Hoey is bisexual. She is married to Dan Waugh.

References

External links
 Labour Party profile

1988 births
Living people
Alumni of University College Cork
Alumni of the University of Limerick
Bisexual politicians
Bisexual women
Labour Party (Ireland) senators
LGBT legislators in Ireland
Local councillors in County Meath
Members of the 26th Seanad
21st-century women members of Seanad Éireann
People from Drogheda
21st-century LGBT people